Ashue is an unincorporated community in Yakima County, Washington, United States, located approximately two mile southwest of Wapato.

Ashue was established in 1912 by the Toppenish, Simcoe and Western Railway Company. The community was named after five families who lived nearby.

References

Northern Pacific Railway
Unincorporated communities in Yakima County, Washington
Unincorporated communities in Washington (state)
Populated places established in 1912
1912 establishments in Washington (state)